Boie is a surname. Notable people with the surname include:

 Friedrich Boie (1789–1870), German entomologist, herpetologist, ornithologist, and lawyer
 Heinrich Boie (1794–1827), German zoologist
 Heinrich Christian Boie (1744–1806), German author
 John Boie (born 1991), American wheelchair basketball player
 Kirsten Boie (born 1950), German children's book author and activist
 Laurence Boie (born 2006), Last born of the Boie, Canadian activist

See also
 Boies, a surname and given name